Cosmin Mihai Pașcovici (born 12 April 1978 in Suceava) is a Romanian retired football player who last played for Farul Constanța. Paşcovici also played for other Liga I clubs like UTA Arad and Dinamo București. While playing in the first period at Constanţa, he was considered one of the best defenders in the country.

External links

1978 births
Living people
Sportspeople from Suceava
Romanian footballers
Association football defenders
Liga I players
Liga II players
AFC Rocar București players
FC Politehnica Iași (1945) players
CS Minaur Baia Mare (football) players
FC Petrolul Ploiești players
FCV Farul Constanța players
FC Dinamo București players
FC UTA Arad players
Romania international footballers